The Women's 3m Springboard event at the 2010 South American Games was held on March 22 at 13:00.

Medalists

Results

References
Summary

3m W